Maria Anna Stubenberg (August 9, 1821December 1, 1912) was a German composer who used Hungarian and gypsy folk tunes in her compositions.

Biography
Maria Anna Herrin und Gräfin von Buttlar-Stubenberg was born in Graz, Austria, to Gustav Adolf Josef Christian Felix Herr und Graf von Stubenberg and Maria Franciszka Freiin Staudach. She married Johann Remekhazy von Gurahoncz on February 15, 1840, and Friedrich Graf von Zichy on February 22, 1848. Her married names were Remekhazy von Gurahoncz, and von Zichy.

Works 

Stubenberg lived in Hungary as a child, and used Hungarian and gypsy folk tunes in her compositions for voice, piano, and zither.  She composed works ranging through at least opus 90, using texts from folksongs and writers such as Eugen Graf Aichelburg, Rudolph Baumbach, William Bosworth, Friedrich Ferdinand, Graf von Beust, Emanuel von Geibel, Heinrich Heine, and Nikolaus Lenau. Her music was published by Josef Eberle and Wiener Musik Verlagshaus (later F. Roerich & Co.). 

Selected works include:
In mein gar zu dunkles Leben, op. 63 (Text: Heinrich Heine)
Sie haben mich gequälet, op. 76 (Text: Heinrich Heine)

References

External links
 
 Hear Mazur in e minor, opus 2 number 3 by Maria Anna Stubenberg

1821 births
1912 deaths
19th-century classical composers
20th-century classical composers
German classical composers
German music educators
Women classical composers
20th-century German composers
19th-century German composers
Women music educators
20th-century women composers
19th-century women composers